The Purdue Research Parks are a network of four research parks located in Indiana, United States. The other facilities are located in Merrillville, Indianapolis, and New Albany. The parks were developed by the Purdue Research Foundation.

Under development since the late 1990s, the Purdue Research Parks are now home to nearly 200 companies encompassing numerous industries and fields of study, including biology, materials science, and information science, among others.  Purdue University and Purdue Research Foundation operate business incubation programs to assist organizations in the process of commercializing innovative technologies.  It represents the largest cluster of "technology-based companies" in Indiana.

Economic impact 

Locations 
The network of four research park locations are referred to as Purdue Research Park of West Lafayette, Purdue Research Park of Indianapolis, Purdue Research Park of Northwest Indiana (Merrillville) and Purdue Research Park of Southeast Indiana (New Albany).

West Lafayette 
The West Lafayette location was Indiana's "first designated certified technology park", a 725 acre (2.93 km2) site employing more than 3000 people .

As the largest university-affiliated, high-tech park in the United States, the West Lafayette Purdue Research Park is made up more than 50 distinct buildings.  Key buildings include:

Incubation facilities 
Business and Technology Center
Purdue Technology Center
Herman and Heddy Kurz Purdue Technology Center

Graduation facilities 
International Technology Center
Lakeview Technology Center
Pritsker Building
Ross Enterprise Center
Vistech 1

Other affiliated facilities 
The Chao Center for Industrial Pharmacy & Contract Manufacturing
 Broadband Antenna Tracking Systems

Resident companies 
Arxan Technologies, Inc.
 Akina, Inc.
Butler America Aerospace & Defense
The Chao Center for Industrial Pharmacy & Contract Manufacturing
Cook Biotech, Inc.
CoVideo
C-SPAN Archives
 Delphi E&S - Verification Lab
Dow AgroSciences
Endocyte
Endocyte, a pharmaceutical company, is developing EC145 (Vintafolide), a candidate drug for use in chemotherapy-resistant patients with non-small-cell lung cancer.  EC145 has undergone a Phase II clinical trial.
FLIR Systems Inc.
 Imaginestics LLC
 Cook MED Institute
Perfinity Biosciences
Simulex Inc.
Spensa Technologies (DTN)

Northwest Indiana 
In 2013, the data management company Intercontinental Industries (operating as interLink) took up residence at the Northwest Indiana location.

References

External links 
Purdue Research Park Home Page
Purdue Research Park Praise
Purdue Research Foundation
Lonergan Partners Introduces Silicon Valley Investors

Science parks in the United States
Purdue University
West Lafayette, Indiana
1961 establishments in Indiana
Purdue University campus
Economy of Indiana
Merrillville, Indiana